The Arcos del Milenio, officially the Arcos del Tercer Milenio, is a sculpture by Sebastián, installed in Guadalajara, Jalisco, Mexico. It is located along Avenues Mariano Otero and Lázaro Cárdenas.

It was approved in 1999 by Francisco Javier Ramírez Acuña, the then-municipal president. The artwork is incomplete, as it only has placed four out of six arches. The first three arches were placed between 2000 and 2001, while the fourth one in 2005. Due to budget constraints and public opposition, the municipality will not continue paying for its conclusion. Sebastián has asked some private corporations to complete it. A miniature replica of the full planned monument was built at a park in the nearby town of Tapalpa.

The arches are commonly graffitied.

References

External links

 

2000s sculptures
2000s establishments in Mexico
Metal sculptures
Outdoor sculptures in Guadalajara